Jakova is a surname. Notable people with the surname include:

Ludovik Jakova (1912–1988), Albanian footballer and coach
Prenk Jakova (1917–1969), Albanian composer, musician, and author
Tuk Jakova (1914–1959), Albanian politician

See also
Jakova, former Albanian name of Gjakovë, city and municipality in western Kosovo